Sam Effah (born December 29, 1988) is a Canadian sprinter. In July 2010,  Effah became, what was then, the fourth fastest Canadian ever after running a 10.06 in the 100 metre. At the 2009 Canada Games Effah won the gold medal in the 200 m.

Early life
Effah was born in Calgary, Alberta on December 29, 1988, to parents who emigrated from Ghana.

Collegiate career
Effah attended and competed for the University of Calgary.

Statistics

Personal bests

Filmography

Television

References

External links
https://godinos.com/sports/track-and-field/roster/sam-effah/1502
Athletics Canada Profile

Living people
1988 births
Black Canadian track and field athletes
Canadian male sprinters
Athletes (track and field) at the 2010 Commonwealth Games
Canadian people of Ghanaian descent
Athletes from Calgary
University of Calgary alumni
Athletes (track and field) at the 2018 Commonwealth Games
The Amazing Race Canada contestants
Commonwealth Games competitors for Canada